The Men's RS:X class at the 2011 ISAF Sailing World Championships was held in Perth, Western Australia between 12 and 18 December 2011.

Results

References

External links

Men's RS:X
Windsurfing World Championships